Artsvanik is a village in the Kapan Municipality of the Syunik Province in Armenia.

Etymology 
The village has previously been known as Yeritsvanik, Yeritsvank’, Yertsu Vank’, Karmir Vank’, Yerets’, Yerets and Yeretsvanik.

Demographics 
In 1908, Artsvanik had a predominantly Armenian population of 952 within the Zangezur Uyezd of the Elisabethpol Governorate of the Russian Empire.

The National Statistical Service of the Republic of Armenia (ARMSTAT) reported its population as 578 in 2010, down from 652 at the 2001 census.

References 

Populated places in Syunik Province